The USSR Academy of Medical Sciences was the highest scientific and medical organization founded in the Soviet Union founded in 1944.

Its successor is the Russian Academy of Medical Sciences founded in 1992, and is a part of the Russian Academy of Sciences since 2013.

Presidents of the USSR Academy of Medical Sciences and the Russian Academy of Medical Sciences 
 from 1944 to 1946 – Nikolay Burdenko
 from 1946 to 1953 – Nikolay Anichkov
 from 1953 to 1960 – Aleksandr Bakulev
 from 1960 to 1968 and from 1977 to 1987 – Nikolay Blokhin
 from 1968 to 1977  – Vladimir Timakov
 from 1987 to 2006 – Valentin Pokrovsky
 from 2006 to 2011 – Mikhail Davydov
 from 2011 to 2013 – :ru:Дедов, Иван Иванович

Past and current members 
Alexander Gavrilenko (2004)
Anatoly Pokrovsky
Andrei Snezhnevsky

References

 
Russian National Academies
National academies of sciences
Russian Academy of Medical Sciences
Medical and health organizations based in Russia
Scientific organizations established in 1944
Organizations based in the Soviet Union
Science and technology in the Soviet Union
Health in the Soviet Union
1944 establishments in the Soviet Union